Route 170 is a major east/west highway on the north shore of the St. Lawrence River in Quebec, Canada, and it parallels the Saguenay River on the south side of it. The western terminus of Route 170 is in Métabetchouan–Lac-à-la-Croix at the junction of Route 169, at Lac Saint-Jean, and the eastern terminus is in Saint-Siméon, at the junction of Route 138, close to the Saint Lawrence River.

It is a busy highway in the Saguenay–Lac-Saint-Jean part as it links the former cities of La Baie, Chicoutimi and Jonquière (now all part of Saguenay) together, and it provides the main link between the Lac-Saint-Jean and Saguenay areas. The stretch of road between La Baie and Saint-Siméon is a very scenic ride in the mountains, and providing access to roads leading to the Saguenay Fjord.

Municipalities along Route 170

 Métabetchouan–Lac-à-la-Croix
 Saint-Gédéon
 Saint-Bruno
 Larouche
 Saguenay - (Jonquière / Chicoutimi / La Baie)
 Saint-Felix-d'Otis
 Rivière-Éternité
 L'Anse-Saint-Jean
 Petit-Saguenay
 Saint-Siméon

See also
 List of Quebec provincial highways

References

External links 
 Provincial Route Map (Courtesy of the Quebec Ministry of Transportation) 

170
Roads in Saguenay–Lac-Saint-Jean
Transport in Saguenay, Quebec